Bragoro, also known as Brapue, is a puberty rite performed by the Akans especially among the Ashantis.

Traditionally, when a young girl experiences her first menstruation that is menarche, she undergoes this rite called Bragoro. It is believed that this ushers her into womanhood.

Soon after a young girl experiences her first menstruation, her mother reports it to the council of elders, queenmothers and community leaders to signal to them that her daughter is now ready and qualifies to be initiated.

Though Bragoro has a lot of cultural significance it  is now disappearing.

References 

Akan people
Rites of passage